Laura del Sol (born 27 November 1961) is a  Spanish flamenco dancer and film actress, specially well known for her titular role in Carlos Saura's 1983 film Carmen. She worked with Saura and Antonio Gades in El Amor brujo, and in Italy, she acted in Giuseppe Tornatore's debut Il Camorrista.

She was born in Barcelona.

Partial filmography

 ¡¡Se armó el belén!! (1970) - Actress Child in Spot Tv (uncredited)
 Carmen (1983) - Carmen
 Las bicicletas son para el verano (1983) - Bailarina
 The Hit (1984) - Maggie
 Los zancos (1984) - Teresa
 The Two Lives of Mattia Pascal (1985) - Romilda Pescatore
 El Amor brujo (1986) - Lucía
 Il Camorrista (1986) - Rosaria
 El viaje a ninguna parte (1986) - Juanita Plaza
 El gran Serafín (1987) - Blanchette Medor
 Daniya, jardín del harem (1988) - Laila
 Disamistade (1988) - Domenicangela
  Killing Dad or How to Love Your Mother (1989) - Luisa
 L'aventure extraordinaire d'un papa peu ordinaire (1990) - Laura
 Amelia Lópes O'Neill (1991) - Amelia Lópes O'Neil
 El rey pasmado (1991) - Marfisa
 La nuit de l'océan (1992) - Maria
 Tombés du ciel (1993) - Angela
 Santera (1994) -  Paula
 Três Irmãos (1994) - Teresa
 The Crew (1994) - Camilla Marquez
 Tatiana, la muñeca rusa (1995) - Pat
 Gran Slalom (1996) - Vicky
 Il figlio di Bakunin (1997) - Donna Margherita
 Furia (1999) - Olga
 Tôt ou tard (1999) - Consuelo
 Not registered (1999) - Rosa
 Sotto gli occhi di tutti (2002) - Rosa
 Le monde nous appartient (2012) - La mère de Julien (photo)

References

External links
 

1961 births
Living people
Actresses from Barcelona
Flamenco dancers
Spanish female dancers
Spanish film actresses
Spanish television actresses